This article details the Castleford Tigers rugby league football club's 2016 season. This is the Tigers 9th consecutive season in the Super League.

Table

To be inserted.

2016 fixtures and results

Tigers score is first.

2016 Super League Fixtures

2016 Super 8's

2016 Play-offs

Player appearances
Super League Only

 = Injured

 = Suspended

Challenge Cup

Player appearances
Challenge Cup Games only

2016 squad statistics

 Appearances and Points include (Super League, Challenge Cup and play-offs) as of 28 March 2016.

 = Injured
 = Suspended

2016 transfers in/out

In

Out

References

External links
Castleford Tigers Website
Castleford Tigers - SL Website

Castleford Tigers seasons
Super League XXI by club